John Bacon may refer to:

Art
John Bacon (sculptor, born 1740) (1740–1799), British sculptor
John Bacon (sculptor, born 1777) (1777–1859), British sculptor
John Henry Frederick Bacon, British painter and illustrator

Military
John M. Bacon (1844–1913), American general 
John Bacon (loyalist) (died 1783), loyalist guerilla fighter during the American Revolutionary War

Politics
John Bacon (Massachusetts politician) (1738–1820), US Representative from Massachusetts
John E. Bacon (South Carolina politician) (1830–1897), South Carolina politician, diplomat
John E. Bacon (Arizona politician) (1869–1964), Arizona politician, doctor
John F. Bacon (1789–1860), clerk of the New York State Senate, and U.S. Consul at Nassau, Bahamas
John L. Bacon (1878–1961), mayor of San Diego, California

Sports
John Bacon (footballer) (born 1973), Irish footballer
John Bacon (cricketer) (1871–1942), English cricketer

Others
John Mackenzie Bacon (1846–1904), English astronomer, aeronaut, and lecturer
John Bacon (clerk) (1738–1816), British clerk and editor
John Bacon (judge) (died 1321), English judge
John Bacon (landlord), friend of Robert Burns
John Lement Bacon (1862–1909), Vermont banker, businessman and politician
John U. Bacon (born 1964), American author 
John Baconthorpe, a.k.a. John Bacon (c. 1290–1346), English Carmelite monk
John Bacon (Dedham) (died 1683), early American settler